Joan Ure was the pen name of Elizabeth Thoms Clark (22 June 1918 – 1978), a Scottish poet and playwright. She was born Elizabeth  Thoms Carswell on 22 June 1918 in Wallsend, Tyneside, of Scottish parents who moved to Glasgow. She had a daughter, Frances, by Jack Clark, a businessman. Her sister Joan provided the first half of her pen name.

Being a Scot
Joan chose the pen-name Ure, because it sounded more Scottish to her. 
Having been born in England made her self-consciously Scots, and she adopted an ironic refrain throughout her public writing: "Scottish, more or less" and "as Scots as I am". In correspondence she wrote "I could say I am an Englishman, and spite 'em all."

Work
Joan Ure wrote short stories and poems as well as short plays, but she made her mark with her work for the theatre. She never wrote a full-length play.      
Among her work to achieve a professional production, I See Myself as This Young Girl, an exploration of a mother-daughter relationship, was directed by Michael Meacham at the close theatre Club, Glasgow, in 1967. It demonstrated her lyrical gifts.

She wrote her first play, Cendrillon, in French, for the 4th year school class to perform.

Death by suicide was one of her themes, summed up in the poem, In Memoriam 1971, published in Scottish International.

Her poem Signal at Red, written 1964, is addressed to her correspondent, John Cairns, and alludes to Ian Hamilton Finlay, with whom she had put on plays at the Falcon Theatre in 1962, hers being Punctuated Rhythms. He is also the disappointing lover referred to in her short story, Midsummer's Eve, published in Words 6 in 1978.  She claims he was almost the death of her, though she doesn't specify how & there's nothing in the correspondence, 1963–1971, to suggest she ever proposed leaving her husband for him.

Another poem, "In Memoriam" 1971, deals with another of her themes, death, by suicide, primarily incited by that of her sister, Joan's.

One of her best plays is the revue Nothing May Come of It which incorporates song and dance.  She characterises people she knew including her correspondent as the lead actress in Nothing May Come of It as well as Puck in Seven Characters out of the Dream.

Her correspondence with John Cairns provides a framework for understanding her life and work and is shortly to be published by Ki Publishing as CORRESPONDENCE.

Scottish Society of Playwrights
Joan Ure, Ena Lamont Stewart, and Ada F Kay were among the founder members of the Scottish Society of Playwrights, which was set up after a meeting called in September 1973 by Hector MacMillan, Ena Lamont Stewart and John Hall.

Acclaim in Scotland
A poem by Joan Ure was suggested by members of the public as one of the runners-up for the Scottish Parliament's Canongate Wall Project to commemorate the 10th anniversary of the Holyrood Parliament:

A country makes the artists it deserves / As it makes governments / Our artists shriek in paranoiac discords / When they are not just havering / You hope they do not feel they speak for you.
The Canongate Wall

Acclaim abroad
The University of Bologna, Italy, teaches several English Literature modules, using Joan Ure's plays Qualcosa anche per Cordelia (Something in it for Cordelia), and Sette Personaggi Venuti dal sogno (Seven Characters out of a dream).
Dream English
Cordelia English
Cordelia English
Characters English

The University of Parma, Italy, also uses two plays by Joan Ure in their English Literature programme: Come una ragazzina (1968) and Riprendi la tua costola ! (1974) are available in the Italian translation by Panozzo Editore who describe her works as "confronting the themes of the condition and emancipation of women .... with the irony which characterises the whole work of Joan Ure".
 https://web.archive.org/web/20100425015135/http://www.diplingue.unipr.it/Ricerca%20e%20pubblicazioni/Pagine%20personali/Angeletti.html
 http://www.ibs.it/code/9788874721337/ure-joan/come-una-ragazzina.html

External links

International Journal of Scottish Theatre, Vol.3 no.1, 'Is it not possible to have a Poem made out of Theatre?' - An assessment of the dramas and dramaturgy of Joan Ure
Scottish Women Playwrights against Zero Visibility, by Ksenija Horvat, Google Docs
Open Library: Joan Ure, Five Short Plays
Text of Joan Ure's play "Something in it for Cordelia"
Scottish Review, 5 August 2010: Kenneth Roy, 'Land of the forgotten sex'
Ki Publishing Blog on forthcoming publication of "Correspondence" (letters between Ure and John Cairns)
Five Songs by Joan Ure
Joan Ure songs: lyrics

References
 Robert Crawford, Scotland's Books: A History of Scottish Literature, Oxford University Press, 2009, p. 635

1918 births
1978 deaths
Scottish women poets
Scottish women dramatists and playwrights
People from Wallsend
Writers from Tyne and Wear
Writers from Glasgow
20th-century British women writers
20th-century Scottish poets
20th-century Scottish dramatists and playwrights
Pseudonymous women writers
20th-century Scottish women
20th-century pseudonymous writers